Jack James Miller III is an American football quarterback for the Florida Gators. Miller attended and played high school football at Chaparral High School located in Scottsdale, Arizona. Following his time as a backup with the Ohio State Buckeyes, Miller announced that he would be transferring to the University of Florida.

Early life and high school career
Miller was born in Scottsdale, Arizona and  later attended Chaparral High School in Scottsdale, Arizona. Miller holds the Arizona state record with 115 passing touchdowns, 3,653 passing yards and 53 touchdowns in a season. Miller was selected as a MaxPreps in 2020. He committed to Ohio State University to play college football.

College career

Ohio State
Miller spent his true freshman year at Ohio State as a backup to Justin Fields. He did not attempt any passes but scored a rushing touchdown against Nebraska.

Miller was named the backup quarterback to C. J. Stroud as a redshirt-freshman following the departure of Fields to the 2021 NFL Draft. He played in four games following blowout leads. On November 28, 2021, Miller announced that he was leaving Ohio State. On December 21, 2021, Miller announced his commitment to the Florida Gators.

Florida
On December 21, 2021, Miller transferred to Florida.

College statistics

References

External links
Ohio State profile

Living people
American football quarterbacks
Ohio State Buckeyes football players
Florida Gators football players
People from Scottsdale, Arizona
Players of American football from Arizona
2002 births